The women's 50 metre freestyle S10 event at the 2016 Paralympic Games took place on 9 September 2016, at the Olympic Aquatics Stadium. Three heats were held. The swimmers with the eight fastest times advanced to the final.

Heats

Heat 1 
10:15 9 September 2016:

Heat 2 
10:18 9 September 2016:

Heat 3 
10:20 9 September 2016:

Final
18:35 9 September 2016:

Notes

Swimming at the 2016 Summer Paralympics